is a former Japanese actress known for her role as Amy Yuuzuki/Kyoryu Pink in the 2013 Super Sentai series Zyuden Sentai Kyoryuger. In July 2018, she announced her retirement from acting to pursue an opportunity outside the entertainment industry.

Filmography

Film
Another (2012)
Tokumei Sentai Go-Busters vs. Kaizoku Sentai Gokaiger: The Movie (2013) as Kyoryu Pink (voice only)
Kamen Rider × Super Sentai × Space Sheriff: Super Hero Taisen Z (2013) as Amy Yuuzuki/Kyoryu Pink
Zyuden Sentai Kyoryuger: Gaburincho of Music (2013) as Amy Yuuzuki/Kyoryu Pink
School Girl Complex (2013) as Mayu Nishino
Zyuden Sentai Kyoryuger vs. Go-Busters: The Great Dinosaur Battle! Farewell Our Eternal Friends (2014) as Amy Yuuzuki/Kyoryu Pink
We're the Bounty Hunter Troupe (2014) as Kaori Sakurakawa
Love Manga Typhoon!! as Kumi Kawano (2014)
Ressha Sentai ToQger vs. Kyoryuger: The Movie (2015) as Amy Yuuzuki/Kyoryu Pink
Strobe Edge (2015)
The Disastrous Life of Saiki K. (2017)

TV series
Zyuden Sentai Kyoryuger (2013) as Amy Yuuzuki/Kyoryu Pink
Yabai Kenji Yaba Ken 4 ~Yabaken no Bōsō Sōsa~ (2014) as Risa Asakawa
Kaiki Renai Sakusen (2015) as Moeka
Ushijima the Loan Shark (2016) as Miyuki Uehara

V-Cinema
Zyuden Sentai Kyoryuger Returns: Hundred Years After (2014) as Amy Yuuzuki/Kyoryu Pink, Big Sister Ami/Kyoryu Cyan/Kyoryu Pink
Nagashiya Teppei (2015) as Shizuku Inoue

Internet film
Net Movie: Kamen Rider × Super Sentai × Space Sheriff: Super Hero Taisen Otsu!: Heroo! Answers (2013) as Amy Yuuzuki

Video
Ayu to Thai (2013)

References

External links
 

21st-century Japanese actresses
1997 births
Living people